Textile History  is a peer-reviewed academic journal first published in 1968 and published by Maney Publishing on behalf of the Pasold Research Fund. It covers "aspects of the cultural and social history of apparel and textiles, as well as issues arising from the exhibition, preservation and interpretation of historic textiles or clothing".

Abstracting and indexing
The journal is indexed in publications including Arts and Humanities Citation Index, British Humanities Index and Historical Abstracts.

References

History of the textile industry
Industrial history
Publications established in 1968
Biannual journals